Coprosma elegans is a flowering plant species in the genus Coprosma found in New Guinea.

References

External links

 Holotype of Coprosma elegans Utteridge (family RUBIACEAE) at Jstor Global plants

elegans
Flora of New Guinea
Plants described in 2002